was a Japanese stage director, translator, and actor. He was born in Kanagawa Prefecture. His father was architect Tamekicki Ito and his mother was Kamiye Iijima. His older brother was the dancer and choreographer Michio Ito.

Biography
He is known mostly for founding the Haiyūza theatre company, and translating and directing the works of Bertolt Brecht in post-World War II Japan. He appeared in more than 50 films between 1936 and 1970.

His stage name comes from an incident following the 1923 Great Kantō earthquake when he was attacked by a mob in Sendagaya, Tokyo. The vigilantes mistook him for a Korean. He was a leader in the modern theater movement in Japan, helping found the Haiyuza Theatre Company, and performing works that "bridged the gap from age-old traditional theater to politically oriented avant-garde and modern works".

In the late 1920s and early 1930s, Senda lived in Berlin, where he was involved with underground theatre performances. He was involved with the community of Japanese artists living in Germany who was actively engaged with political activism.

To supplement his income, in 1930 Senda founded the design studio Tomoe in Berlin, with the painter Osuke Shimazaki, lacquer artist Kotaro Fukuoka, photographer Hiroshi Yoshizawa, and Bauhaus students Iwao and Michiko Yamawaki, a photographer and architect, and a textile artist, respectively.  The studio produced posters, gift-wrap paper and leaflets, and undertook window dressing and interior design for Japanese restaurants.

Senda and his wife, Irma, returned to Japan in January 1931 via Moscow on the Trans-Siberian Railway.

Selected filmography

 Eine Nacht in Yoshiwara (1928)
 Hantô no maihime (1936) - Tomei's friend
 Sakura no sono (1936) - Tomoo Serizawa
 Kûsô buraku (1939) - Daisuke Yokokawa
 Hideko no ôendanchô (1940) - Jiro Takashima, Ichiro's brother
 The Love of the Actress Sumako (1947)
 Waga koi wa moenu (1949) - Prime Minister Inagki
 Shin'ya no kokuhaku (1949)
 Mahiru no embukyoku (1949) - Yoshiki Sakazaki
 Zen-ma (1951) - Tsuyoshi Kitaura
 Koibito (1951)
 Himitsu (1952) - Sakutaro Maki
 Magokoro (1953) - Yûzô Ariga
 Jûdai no seiten (1953) - Shûhei, Kaoru's father
 Aoiro kakumei (1953) - Tatsukichi Koizumi
 Hiroba no kodoku (1953)
 Taiheiyô no washi (1953)
 Waseda daigaku (1953) - Haruo Kageyama
 Gate of Hell (1953) - Gen Kiyomori
 Shishun no izumi (1953) - Priest
 Life of a Woman (1953) - Fujiko's father
 Shinsengumi Oni Taicho (1954)
 Kunsho (1954) 
 Nyonin no yakata (1954)
  (1955) - Konoye
 Tsuki ni tobu kari (1955) - Masayoshi, Kimiko's father
 Seishun kaidan (1955) - Takaya Okumura
 The Phantom Horse (1955) - Hamamura
 Shin Heike Monogatari (1955) - Sadaijin Fujiwara no Yorinaga
 Yûhi to kenjû (1956)
 Mori wa ikiteiru (1956) - Prime minister
 Tsukigata Hanpeita: Hana no maki; Arashi no maki (1956) - Kintomo Anegakôji
 An Actress (1956) - Yasuda
 Joyu (1956) - Yasuda
 Yûwaku (1957) - Shôkichi Sugimoto
 Hadairo no tsuki (1957) - Kôhei Ôike
 Bitoku no yoromeki (1957) - Fuji
 A Slope in the Sun (1958) - Tamakichi, Shinji's father
 Yoru no hamon (1958) - Shûsem Ashida
 Yoku (1958) - Kurokawa
 The H-Man (1958) - Dr. Maki
 Varan the Unbelievable (1958) - Dr. Sugimoto
 Riko na oyome-san (1958)
 Wakai kawa no nagare (1959) - Daizô Kawasaki
 Lucky Dragon No. 5 (1959) - Dr. Kinoshita
 Battle in Outer Space (1959) - Professor Adachi
 Shinran (1960) - Tsukiwa
 Aoi yaju (1960) - Ayako's Father
 Zoku shinran (1960)
 Matsukawa-Jiken (1961)
 Shin Genji monogatari (1961)
 Buda (1961) - Shuddhodana
 Arabu no arashi (1961)
 Onnakeizu (1962) - Sunzo Sakai
 Varan the Unbelievable (1962) - Observer
 Shiro to kuro (1963) - Munakata
 Miyamoto Musashi: Ichijôji no kettô (1964)
 Miyamoto Musashi: Ganryû-jima no kettô (1965) - Hon'ami Koetsu
 Kemonomichi (1965)
 Tora! Tora! Tora! (1970) - Prince Fumimaro Konoe

References

External links

1904 births
1994 deaths
Japanese male film actors
Japanese theatre directors
20th-century Japanese male actors
People from Kanagawa Prefecture